Carvonic acid, or α-methylene-4-methyl-5-oxo-3-cyclohexene-1-acetic acid, is a terpenoid formed by metabolism of carvone in humans.

References

Carboxylic acids
Monoterpenes
Enones
Cyclohexenes